Luis Miguel Guillorme Gonzalez (born September 27, 1994) is a Venezuelan professional baseball infielder for the New York Mets of Major League Baseball (MLB).

Early life
Guillorme was born in Caracas, Venezuela. His grandparents immigrated from Spain and he holds dual Spanish and Venezuelan citizenship. As a child, he modeled his game after native Caracas infielder Omar Vizquel. In 2007, his family relocated to Davie, Florida.

Guillorme attended Coral Springs Charter School in Coral Springs, Florida where, as a senior, he hit .565 with 34 runs batted in. He committed to play college baseball at State College of Florida, Manatee–Sarasota.

Professional career

New York Mets

Minor leagues
The New York Mets selected Guillorme in the 10th round of the 2013 Major League Baseball draft. He spent his first professional season with the Gulf Coast Mets where he slashed .258/.337/.283 with 11 RBIs in 41 games. He played 2014 with the Kingsport Mets and Savannah Sand Gnats, batting a combined .283 with 17 RBIs in sixty total games between both teams. He returned to Savannah in 2015 and was named the South Atlantic League MVP after he batted .381 with 55 RBIs, 18 stolen bases and a .746 OPS in 122 games. In 2016, Guillorme started at shortstop for the Spanish national baseball team in the qualifying for the 2017 World Baseball Classic. He spent 2016 with the St. Lucie Mets where he posted a .263 batting average with one home run and 46 RBIs, and 2017 with the Binghamton Rumble Ponies where he batted .283 with one home run, 43 RBIs and a .706 OPS.

During a spring training game in 2017, Miami Marlins infielder Adeiny Hechavarria accidentally let go of his bat while swinging at a pitch and sent it flying into the Mets dugout. Guillorme, who was standing at the dugout railing, casually reached up and caught the bat while his teammates scrambled to get out of the way. Highlights of the play went viral.

Major leagues
The Mets added Guillorme to their 40-man roster after the 2017 season. Guillorme was called up to the Mets on May 9, 2018 when Tomas Nido was optioned to the Las Vegas 51s. On May 13 at Citizens Bank Park, Guillorme made his first Major League plate appearance; he singled off of Aaron Nola of the Philadelphia Phillies as a pinch hitter. On August 10, 2019, Guillorme hit his first major league home run in the 8th inning off of reliever Fernando Rodney. He finished the season hitting .246/.324/.361 with 3 RBI. In 2020 for the Mets, Guillorme slashed .333/.426/.439 with 9 RBI in 29 games. On March 14, 2021, Guillorme faced St. Louis Cardinals reliever Jordan Hicks in the longest at-bat in MLB history. The 22 pitch at-bat resulted in a walk. However, because this occurred during spring training, it was not official. In 2021, Guillorme batted .265/.374/.311 over a career-high 69 games.

International career
Guillorme played for the Spanish national baseball team at the 2016 European Baseball Championship in the Netherlands. He was named the tournament's most outstanding defensive player en route to a silver medal. He also represented Spain in the qualifying round of the 2017 World Baseball Classic.

References

External links

1994 births
Living people
Venezuelan people of Spanish descent
Baseball players from Caracas
Baseball players from Florida
Spanish baseball players
Baseball shortstops
Gulf Coast Mets players
Kingsport Mets players
Savannah Sand Gnats players
St. Lucie Mets players
Binghamton Rumble Ponies players
Las Vegas 51s players
Scottsdale Scorpions players
Major League Baseball second basemen
Major League Baseball players from Venezuela
Major League Baseball third basemen
New York Mets players
Spanish expatriate sportspeople in the United States
Venezuelan expatriate baseball players in the United States
Syracuse Mets players
Venezuelan emigrants to the United States